Aj Bogd (lit. "way of life the saint"), is a mountain of the Gobi-Altai Mountains and located in the Altai District, Govi-Altai Province, Mongolia. Its highest peak, Ih Ovoo has an elevation of 3,802 metres (12,480 ft).

See also
 List of Ultras of Central Asia
 List of mountains in Mongolia

References

External links
 "Ich Obo, Mongolia" on Peakbagger

Mountains of Mongolia
Altai Mountains
Govi-Altai Province